The 1977 season was Molde's fourth consecutive year in the top flight, and their 6th season in total in the top flight of Norwegian football. This season Molde competed in 1. divisjon (first tier) and the Norwegian Cup.

In the league, Molde finished in 3rd position, 9 points behind winners Lillestrøm.

Season events

Squad
Source:

Friendlies

Competitions

1. divisjon

Results summary 

Source:

Results

Table

Norwegian Cup

Squad statistics

Appearances and goals
Lacking information:
One goalscorer from 1. divisjon round 15 (away against Viking) is missing.
Appearance statistics from Norwegian Cup round 1 (against Rollon) is missing.

|}

Goalscorers

See also
Molde FK seasons

References

1977
Molde